The Kladovo Transport was an illegal Jewish refugee transport, started on November 25, 1939, in Vienna, the aim of which was to flee to Eretz Israel. As a result of early freezing to the Danube, the refugees in the Yugoslav river-port of Kladovo had to overwinter. In 1940, they waited in vain on a sea-going vessel for the onward journey, and they had to move to the port of Šabac on the Sava, where they were caught by the Nazis in 1941. Only about 200 young people, as well as a few adults could be saved or escape on their own. The men of the transport were shot on 12 and 13 October by units of the Wehrmacht on the orders of General Franz Böhme. The women were transferred in early January 1942 to Sajmište concentration camp, and murdered between 19 March and 10 May 1942 in a gas van, under .

Background
In 1917, the Balfour Declaration by the British supported establishing a Jewish homeland in Palestine and promised the possibility of legal immigration (Aliyah). But it was limited in the 1920s by the introduction of a quota system with certificates of different categories. In the 1930s, Zionist organizations responded with the implementation of illegal transports (Aliya Bet). At the turn of 1938/1939, within the Zionist movement, Haganah in Palestine, Mossad LeAliyah Bet was set up for the organization of illegal shipments. Between the annexation of Austria to the German Reich and the beginning of the Second World War, 17,000 people in 50 illegal transports Europe left Europe.

Austrian Jews were largely assimilated; they supported Jewish integration with financial and moral support, without thinking of one's own emigration. Hechaluz , which has existed since the 1920s, was the Viennese branch organization of the Zionist umbrella organization, and served mainly as a transit station for Eastern European Jews. With the annexation of Austria to the German Reich in 1938, the Nuremberg Laws were adopted overnight. The aggressive policy of expulsion by the Nazis allowed the emigration to a foreign refuge.

In May 1939, the British Mandate government in Palestine published the "White Paper", by which immigration, for the next five years, had been limited to 75,000. Other countries limited the immigration possibilities drastically. After 1938, Ralph Weingarten held a refugee conference in Evian and described his impression of the situation:

It became increasingly difficult for Jews to escape the threat of the Nazis, as their sphere of influence grew. Illegal immigration to Palestine was becoming more and more important, as the organization of transport had been hampered by the outbreak of war. The British considered Jewish refugees from the hostile areas as "enemy aliens" as they left the Balkans to acquire disused ocean vessels. In Romania, 3,000 refugees had already waited for their onward journey.

In the fall of 1939, Adolf Eichmann, founder of the Central Agency for Jewish Emigration in Vienna, put pressure on Georg Überall, Secretary General of the Austrian Hechaluz. Eichmann threatened that all Hechaluz members who had not yet emigrated - there were hundreds waiting in the Hachshara camps outside Vienna for their departure - to deport them to Poland if they did not leave the country. In addition, he ordered "the Committee for Jewish Overseas Transport" and appointed  as its head. Although he was a Jew, he was not a Zionist, and in 1939, with support from the SS, he became increasingly influential in the organization of illegal transport. The Hechalutz representatives saw him as a collaborator of the Nazis and avoided contact, thereby ultimately leading to failure in the project.

Organization of transport 
In the face of threats by Eichmann, Überall decided to dissolve the Hechaluz centers as soon as possible and to bring its members out of the country. In spite of intensive efforts in Italy, Greece, Romania and Bulgaria by Mossad agents who were stationed in these countries, no passenger ship could be obtained. The Mossad agent Moshe Agami gave his assent to the transport. Ferdinand Ceipek, a former National Socialist, supported the Jewish rescue attempts and helped obtain 800 regular entry visas to Slovakia.

For the first time, an illegal transport was also allocated to groups of Youth Aliya. This approach was very controversial; the director of the Vienna Youth Aliyah, Aron Menczer, defended the decision. In a letter to a friend that he wrote shortly after the departure of the group, he stated that there was no other way, that the risk had been assessed, and it was too good to pass up. The group was approximately one third of children and adolescents up to the age of 17, of which half were accompanied by their parents, and the rest in the care of youth associations. Another third were the 18-to-35-year-old members of the Chaluzim of Hechaluz. The remainder was made up of veteran Zionists, who had previously been waiting in vain for entry certificates because of their age, as well as couples and not least individual Jews who were still able to pay a significant amount for the trip despite the political circumstances. 
Equally mixed were the participants with regard to their social origins; they represented the entire spectrum of the Jews of Central Europe, and their religiosity also ranged from Orthodox to moderately traditional to atheistic.

Journey
On November 25, 1939, the 822 Austrians selected for transport were brought by train from Vienna to Bratislava. They could only grab a backpack with personal belongings, which could not exceed more than eight kilos, and according to the "emigration tax threshold", ten Reichsmark in foreign exchange.

Arriving in Bratislava, they were interned in the abandoned munitions factory "Patronka" and a former bachelor quarters ( "Slobodrna") and guarded by members of the Slovak fascist Hlinka Guard. They received provisions from the local Jewish community. The group grew with the addition of 130 refugees from Berlin, 50 from Danzig and about 100 from Prague and Bratislava. While the Danube had already threatened to freeze over, they waited in the camps without finding out about a connection for the onward journey. The Slovak authorities presented an ultimatum in which the group would be returned to the German border. After about ten days' stay, they were brought to the port in buses and were able to board the DDSG steamship Uranus, flying the swastika flag. In the next few hours after the first lunch, all of the refugees had severe diarrhea, which led to the suggestion that they had been poisoned.

At the border with Hungary, the transport was stopped and returned to Bratislava. Contrary to the anxieties that the passengers now had to endure, the Uranus dropped its anchor in Bratislava. The second departure from Bratislava took place on 13 December. However, the DDSG refused to go to the Danube Delta, due to the unsecured onward journey. The passengers were then transferred midstream in Budapest to the three small Yugoslav riverboats "Car Nikola", "Car Dušan" and "Kraljica Marija". These were chartered on behalf of Mossad agent Moshe Agami by the "Association of Jewish Communities of the Kingdom of Yugoslavia" for a lot of money.

Via the three riverboats, the refugees came to Prahovo, where they were moored from 18 to 30 December, because they were denied entry through the Romanian border. 
Meanwhile, the weather conditions made an onward journey impossible, and the Danube iced up, so the riverboats went back to Kladovo, where they were to spend the winter. The General Secretary of the Federation of Jewish Communities of the Kingdom of Yugoslavia, Sime Spitzer, through the Yugoslav government, had to commit himself to take over the group's accommodation. The Jewish communities, however, were already strained by the supply of refugees who had been coming from Germany and Austria after 1933 and the Anschluss. In addition, the port could only be reached with a 24-hour delay due to its unfavorable position and the winter conditions, including a seven-hour sleigh ride, as the nearest railway station was 54 km away. Despite the circumstances, Spitzer promised to provide tolerable conditions for the refugees.

Time in Kladovo
The cramped conditions of the ships that had been willing to temporarily board people for the trip in Kladovo were intolerable and threatening. The six cabins were reserved for the guide and the transportation physician and as a hospital room. All other participants slept huddled on benches and floors in a heated salon or on deck in the cold. 
The hygienic conditions were also catastrophic. Around mid-January, a converted river barge with 280 beds and coke-burning stoves was provided as a relief ship, and after a few weeks, they were given permission to use a narrow shoreline for walking under the guard of gendarmes.

In mid-March 1940, Rose Jacobs and delegates of the American Jewish women's organization Hadassah, during a trip to Europe, noted the arduous journey of the travel group and expressed shock at the situation in a letter:

Jacobs was of the opinion that it was only due to the intense cold that no epidemics had broken out - it was one of the coldest winters of the century. She observed that the refugees on board had, among others, already set up a shoe and clothing repair shop, published their own newspapers and taught Hebrew and English courses. By the end of March, the ships were transferred to the summer port. Through its proximity to the city, some refugees who were given a pass could move more freely for the first time in four months.

As the steamers were used by the shipping company and also cost about $1,000 per day, they were to be deducted and the people accommodated on land. On May 2, the "Car Dušan" and "Kraljica Marija" drove off, but the "Car Dušan" returned in the evening the same day back. 650 people were housed in the village that partly consisted of mud huts and had about 2,000 inhabitants - especially families and elderly, and 18-30 year-old members of the Hachshara youth. They were housed partly in private residences and partly in quickly built shacks. The rest of the Hachshara youth, members of the Youth Aliya and a further 80 or so people remained on the converted tugboat and on the "Car Dušan". The Mizrachi Group still remained on the "Car Nikola". For the Youth Aliya, tents were finally procured in order to build a warehouse near the ship. Additionally, they were allowed to use a 150x350 m area for movement space, which was half prepared as a sports ground. In letters to their relatives, the refugees praised the hospitality of the official authorities in Yugoslavia and that the population was very decent.

From the spring of 1940, joined by other refugees, some alone, the group was thus increased to approximately 1,200 people. So around April, a 20-strong group of young Jews from occupied Poland reached the transport - all school friends from Bielsko. They fled in the depths of winter through Russia, the Carpathian Ukraine and Hungary. Among them was Romek Reich, who later married Herta Eisler.

On May 12, Sime Spitzer and Chief Rabbi David Alcalay came from Belgrade and held a general appeal on the sports field, where they praised the refugees for their perseverance and courage and promised that they would still reach their destination. A train was to reach Kladovo within 24 hours to bring them to the Black Sea, where they could board a passenger ship in the port of Sulina. Since the Romanian authorities initially refused the delivery of the tugboat and only local representatives of the Jewish community association had to travel to Turnu Severin in order to negotiate with the authorities, the arrival of the "Penelope" was delayed for several days. On 21 to 26 May, tables and benches were installed on deck, and wooden bunks were installed in her five bunker rooms. In addition, there were five lavatories. Those refugees who were housed in Kladovo should not come to the "Penelope" until two hours before departure; the others relocated, and all continued to wait for a sign when it would begin. There were many rumors about an imminent next trip, but they were all canceled at the last moment.

Beginning in September 1940, a large illegal transport drove past them: The Storfer transport was the last one that could leave the territory of the German Reich. The ships "Helios", "Melk", "Palace" and "Uranus" did not stop to pick them up. Many had relatives on the ships and were desperate because they could not contact them.

Relocation to Šabac
Because of the incipient Heim ins Reich action, in which Kladovo was viewed as a focal point for ships, the refugees finally had to leave, though not in the desired direction. On 17 September 1940, moored with a tugboat, they were brought to Šabac, located some 300 km upstream on the Sava, arriving on 22 September.

In Šabac, couples and older people were housed with locals all over the city in 380 private furnished rooms, while the majority of young people moved in an abandoned three-story flour mill. Various Zionist youth associations lived in another building, the religious Zionist Mizrachi in a smaller house. In addition to bedrooms, all the buildings were equipped with shared kitchens. The center of the camp was a building block in which additional clothes, material and food warehouses were available and various workshops could be used for retraining courses. There were also administrative offices and the office of a representative of the Jewish community federation in the building. Two local Jewish doctors operated a private hospital with 20 beds in an abandoned sanatorium. Although the Association of Yugoslav Jewish Communities was formally responsible for them, they were able to largely manage themselves.

Through the move to Šabac, more and more order came to life of the refugees; they held concerts and lectures, could move about freely in the city until 8 p.m., and were allowed to go out once a week until midnight. 
They printed newspapers, and organized regular schooling in the Šabac synagogue. 
They could visit the two cinemas in Šabac and a reading room run by the Society of Friends. Although they were not allowed to officially accept any work, some still earned a little pocket money, through which they could improve their sparse food rations. They asked their relatives by letter about interventions for obtaining immigration certificates to Palestine or about immigration channels in the United States, and even contacted the local Palestinian authorities and the Jewish Agency.

Mossad agents announced several times a continuation of their journey, the refugees packed up - and after the cancellation, which came every time at the last moment, they unpacked again. This was the case, for example, with the "Darien II", which had left Alexandria at the end of September 1940 and arrived in Istanbul in October. It was paid for by American Zionist organizations like the Hadassah. However, the journey towards Constanta, where it was to be repaired and adapted for the transport, only began on November 2, as there had been inconsistencies between the Mossad, the Americans and Spitzer due to the payment of the bill for the necessary coal. The adaptation work was to take two to three weeks, after which the "Darien II" should have been available to the refugees. However, the "Darien II" now brought 160 legal refugees to Palestine who could pay full price. The background of this company is not known. When she came back to the port of Sulina, the refugees were to leave there and embark on trains to Šabac. Then came the directive of the shipping company that stated that the departure must stop, on the one hand because of the advanced season, on the other hand because of the uncertain political conditions; only a directive from the highest authorities could change its mind. However, the Yugoslav Prime Minister also rejected the responsibility for the transport. Spitzer, who, since the arrival of the refugees, was continually trying to find new ways and means for further transport of the group of refugees, organized in mid-December a special train to Prahovo, to send them from there by Romanian trains to Sulina. However, when the train came with a Greek flag, he saw in it a risk that was too big for him to take, as he wrote to the Mossad agent Ruth Klüger:

Escape
A few weeks before the German invasion of Yugoslavia, a small part of the refugees had certificates of Youth Aliya, the Zionist women's organization WIZO, and about 50 individual certificates. Among the about 200 to 280 people (the exact number is not known) were mostly young people aged 15 to 17 years, some younger children and girls who had already crossed the age limit of Youth Aliya, some adult caregivers of youth groups, and a few elderly had vouched for the relatives. They got Yugoslav interim passports issued, and had to get visas for Greece, Turkey and Syria. Young people were newly clothed by WIZO and were provided with food and other things necessary for the journey.

Beginning March 16, they traveled in groups of 30 to 50 persons in succession. The journey of the last group threatened to collapse, as all railcars required for mobilization of troops in Yugoslavia; finally, they were able to leave. In the stations along the route, there were Jews who had learned of their passing, and supplied them with food and drinks. Because of bombing of the tracks in Greece and alarms, the journey to Istanbul by train took one week. In Istanbul, the group met in a hotel, and continued the journey by train to the Syrian city of Aleppo to Beirut. In Rosh Hanikra grottoes they reached the Palestinian border. After a stay in a detention camp of the British military, they were distributed to various settlements in the country, mostly kibbutzim, or they moved to relatives already living in the country. One of the rescued youngsters, Ernest Löhner returned later with the Hagana to Yugoslavia, and fought as Parachute liaison officer in Tito's headquarters, then he rose in the Israeli army to the rank of general.

After the destruction of Yugoslavia
With the invasion of Yugoslavia, on April 6, 1941, in Yugoslavia, the capitulation of Yugoslavia on April 17 and the subsequent destruction of Yugoslavia, the Kladovo refugees were overtaken by their pursuers, whom they had fled in 1939. Serbia was placed under German military administration, Šabac became a border town. Already on 16 April, one day before the capitulation of Yugoslavia, the commander of the Security Police and SD, Wilhelm Fuchs, took his first measures against the Kladovo refugees:

Those who registered, were obliged to do forced labor (Zwangsarbeit). At the same time the theft of Jewish property began and Aryanisations in the 23,000 people counted Jewish community of Serbia. On May 30, the military commander Ludwig von Schröder adopted a Jewish Regulation (Judenverordnung), which restricted people's lives harshly, and a labeling requirement did what they had to wear a yellow ribbon with the inscription "Jew". The Belgrade Jewish community has been replaced by the Gestapo by a "representative of the Jewish community of Serbia", whose board they made Sime Spitzer. Spitzer succeeded to send some letters and telegrams to foreign Jewish passages in which he asked both to money and to certificates. The answers were disappointing, especially the news of the fine imposed by the British entry stops for Palestine. Since German emigration was now prohibited, there was no way even for illegal transport. At the same time, Spitzer received the first reports that had already arrived in Croatia, of mistreatment and killings in concentration camps.

After the German invasion, the population was in a state of shock, but there initially were no riots. In the spring, therefore, the combat troops were withdrawn from Serbia and Wehrmacht stationed occupation divisions. In Šabac were the Austrians 6th and 8th Company of the 750th Infantry Regiment of the 718th Infantry Division. On July 20, 1941, the refugees in the camps in Šabac were interned in a barracks just north of the city on the Sava. They had to pack on trucks and walk with all their things. The prisoners were assigned to various forced labor. In September, Felix Benzler demanded the immediate evacuation of the camp and the swift and draconian settlement of the Jewish question that it already came in Croatia.

Guerrilla insurgencies and their consequences
Between mid-July and August 1941, Josip Broz Tito's partisans committed approximately 100 acts of sabotage and were the strategically important and took a weapons factory in Užice. Until the end of July, there was losses of ten men in the first ten days of August, on the part of Wehrmacht. The Chief of the Security Police and SD ordered the execution of hostages and reprisals against the civilian population. Since the resistance of the partisans was not broken, the Wehrmacht commander of Serbia, General Heinrich Danckelmann, called for a reinforcement of troops, which was rejected because of the need in the East. In the event, "mixed Jagdkommandos" from the Security Police, SD and Wehrmacht units were set up, the soldiers were enrolled into the "methods of struggle" between police and SD.

Although so far been no riots in the town of Šabac, the 3rd Company of Police Reserve Battalion 64, as a reinforcement of the three services companies of the 718th Infantry Division. On August 18, they hung ten hostages in the city. On the next day following a "hunting trip" about twenty kilometers west of Šabac about 30 partisans were shot. On the German side were a police officer and three soldiers; Ten soldiers were wounded. As "punishment" about ten to twenty Šabacer Jews were shot in the following night. Refugees of Kladovo group were taken out of interment, and forced to carry the bodies of the Jews through the city and then suspended on pylons. [6] The remaining 63 Šabacer Jews were herded into the concentration camp, which also housed the Kladovo- group. On September 3 Danckelmann stated in a report to the Wehrmacht Commander:

In September, the resistance struggle intensified, which now involved the Chetniks. Partisans and Chetniks controlled throughout southern and western Serbia. Wilhelm List, competent Wehrmacht Commander Southeast for the entire Balkans, called for reinforcements in the form of a combat division, and in charge of Serbia General. For this post, he struck at the same time before Franz Bohme, who as "excellent connoisseur of Balkan relations" due to his experiences in World War I and - like other Austrians - because of that defeat harbored personal revenge. Böhme was appointed Commanding General Agent in Serbia and laid the 12,000-strong 342nd Infantry Division to Serbia. Böhme was ordered by Hitler, to "restore with the sharpest means order." At the same time he carried out the command of Field Marshal Wilhelm Keitel, after which 50 to 100 civilian hostages were to be shot for every German killed. This should come, according to Keitel, from the ranks of political opponents. Boehme however meant by his command to "clean up the sheet" not only the rebels, but also ordered the arrest of all Jews of Serbia.

On September 23, about 1,000 guerrillas penetrated and entered Šabac, and initially brought a factory and the power plant under its authority. Thus Sabac was the first city occupied by Germans, that was attacked by the partisans. The battle for the city, in which on the German side, a tank was used, lasted ten hours. Thereafter, the partisans withdrew again. That same evening a battalion of the 342nd Infantry Division moved under the command of Lieutenant General Walter Hinghofer. Under Boehme's command, they began the next day with the arrest of all 14- to 70-year-old male residents of the city, although they did not belong to the rebels. Their homes were looted, neither weapons nor ammunition were found. After three days, 4,459 male civilians were gathered in a square in the west of the city. During this action 75 men were shot from Sabac and five others were reported as "deceased". An engineering battalion of the 342nd division started now with the construction of another concentration camp north of Sabac: the camp Jarak, however, which was located on Croatian soil.

The 342 division, from parts of the Division reserve, including an anti-tank company and the Radfahrschwadron were on 26 September 1941 onwards, about 5,000 men from the Šabac concentration camp, with them, the Kladovo men, on the run, without food and beatings and shootings for "insubordination" or because they no longer working, driven into the KZ Jarak. In Klenak the German guards were joined Croatian Army members. Already in calling this later as "blood March" a designated 80 men were shot. Of the Kladovo men, 21 found their death in the blood March. Finally, the plans were changed due to the unfavorable position of the military camp, Jarak, so the men again had to return to Šabac to the camp Jarak. There, the concentration camp had since been extended to an abandoned barracks, which were intended for the civilian population. The Kladovo men spent several days in the barracks until they were again postponed on October 4, and returned to the "Jewish camp" in the pioneer barracks.

Shooting of the Kladovo men
On October 2, 1941, news came in, of an attack on the guerrilla units of the Army regiment in Topola where 21 soldiers were killed. Then Bohme ordered 2,100 prisoners to be shot. It instructed the 342nd division of General Hinghofer with the execution and clarified on 10 October his ideas:

 The men were taken to Zasavica (~40 km from the Šabac concentration camp) where all of them were executed in a farmer's field by the 342nd Infantry Division.

Women and children in the Sajmište concentration camp
In early January 1942, the remaining women and children, of Kladovo were transferred from the camp in Sabac to the Sajmište concentration camp. First, they were brought by rail to the lying on Croatian soil city Ruma, from where they had to walk to the Sajmiste concentration camp, located north of the Sava in the Zemun district of Belgrade. On their deep winter death march frostbitten children and old women fell behind in the snow. In the Sajmište concentration camp, there were already over 5,000 Serbian Jewish women, children and old people huddled in the cold walls of the pavilion 3. The Organisation Todt had neglected it, KZ to adapt in time, even though they had six weeks. In a bombing of the nearby Belgrade airport in April 1941, which had opened in 1937, the fairground had been severely affected. The barracks possessed no sanitary facilities except two wells, and the windows were broken. Through the roof snow fell and froze on the concrete floor. Only after some time, did the Organisation Todt provide three storey wooden racks for beds, without a ceiling, without sheets, and only straw that has never been changed. The food they got from the Belgrade care - from the remains that were left from the Belgrade population, supplied, on average, about 80 grams of food per day and person. For each of the 300 infants, there was 200 grams of milk per day. Every night, between 10 and 25 people died of hunger and cold. The bodies of the deceased had to be disposed by the inmates on the frozen Sava, where they were taken by the Belgrade municipality staff car, and driven to the Jewish cemetery.

The camp hospital was crowded, so many patients may be transferred to Belgrade hospitals. A staff member said after the war as a witness:

The person in charge of the camp, the head of the Gestapo Lothar Kraus, was replaced by Hans Helm in February 1942, who testified later:

When the prisoners were protesting in January because of unbearable hunger, SS Sturmfiihrer Stracke threatened that immediately 100 of them would be shot if there were further protests.

In January 1942, shortly before the transfer of the women and children of Kladovo, Herbert Andorfer was commander of the Sajmište concentration camp. The current manager, squad leader Edgar Enge was put to him as adjutant. Internally, however, the camp was passed through the Jewish camp self-government. According to Andorfer's statements an intimate relationship developed between him and the Jewish camp self-government. He drank coffee with them and told them they would soon be transported to Romania.

The Sajmište concentration camp was regarded by the Germans in Serbia, only as a temporary interim solution until the deportation of Jews to the East. At the Wannsee Conference at the end of January 1942, however, it became clear that the deportation of Serbian Jews had no priority and they would have a longer stay in Serbia itself. That became inconvenient for the occupiers for several reasons, not least because the Wehrmacht required concentration camps for internment of partisans. For  it was a matter of prestige, as it had already been used for summer vehemently for their deportation and the Jews were already collected and "ready".

Murder in gas vans
Andorfer was probably informed by the delivery of a "special vehicle" in the first week of March, in which the Jews were to be "put to sleep". To ensure the smooth running of the gassings, he forged a plan: he made known agent attacks in the camp, that there would for the time being, a stopover in a new, better camp on Serbian soil. When asked about details he responded with a fictitious order for the new camp. He assured them that each transport will be accompanied by a Jewish doctor and a nurse, who would go take care of their health. Assuming their situation could only improve, they looked forward to the relocation. The compilation of Transportation took over the Jewish camp that death candidates volunteered. According to a survivor, Andorfer still advised them to take only the most valuable things, because the Board would be very good in the new camp.

From 19 March to 10 May 1942, from Monday to Saturday every day in the morning, a smaller truck came, in which the luggage was loaded, and the gray painted gas vans in which each group of items from 50 to 80 people got in realizing nothing. One of the drivers distributed more sweets to children. When all were inside the car, the hinged door was locked behind them. The gas car was followed by the smaller truck and a car, in which Andorfer and his aide Enge sat, on the Sava Bridge. Since the camp was on the Croatian side of the Sava, they had to pass Croatian border posts; however, special papers helped them to pass unobstructed. After that, the small truck turned off and brought the luggage to Belgrade depot of the National Socialist People's Welfare.

During a brief stop, the van driver lifted a lever, whereby the exhaust gases were directed into the car. So the car drove across Belgrade and further to approximately 15 kilometers southeast located in Avala shooting (according to another source in Jajinci in Vozdovac). There pits had already been dug by a prisoner command. Another inmate command had to get the bodies out of the car and bury them in the pit. Finally, the men of the "gravedigger commands" were shot with machine guns and also thrown into the mass grave. Edgar Enge said at his trial in the 1960s:

In November 1943, when anticipating the German defeat, the Sonderkommando 1005 under Paul Blobel began to dig the buried bodies and stack them on pyres to burn. This cover-up lasted for four months.

In May 1942, there were still a few survivors of Kladovo, together with a group of German Jews from Banat, in the Sajmište concentration camp. They were intended to cleanse the camp. When they were done, most of them were shot. Only a handful survived, mainly the Jewish who married with non-Jewish women, who were released on the promise of confidentiality. Of the last Jewish refugees accommodated in Sabac, only Dorothea Fink as Aryan and Borika Betting Dorfer survived, who already in late November 1941 took the permission for eye surgery in Belgrade to flee.

Legacy

The fate of the participants of Kladovo became known only after the war, and then only partially. After 1945, the members were informed that all participants of transport would have been shot in the autumn 1941. Many of these families have never learned that the women and children were in the Sajmište concentration camp, and are eventually killed in gas vans. Even 50 years later, not all details of the events were known. Gabriele Anderl and Walter Manoschek reconstructed the events based on documents, statements from survivors, witnesses and members of the Wehrmacht, and surviving letters and diaries of the participants. The results they published in 1993 in the book Failed escape. The Jewish "Kladovo Transport". As late as 1992, Anderlecht reported in their contribution emigration and expulsion, which was published in Erika Weinzierl book expulsion and new beginnings, about the Kladovo transport. Zeljko Dragic during research for his dissertation, on the ratio of the Serbian Orthodox Church to Judaism in the 20th century, came to the three excursion boats and gave birth to the idea for an exhibition that was shown in 2012 in Burgenland Croatian Centre in Vienna. He collected further material and spent a week with witnesses from Israel in Serbia.

In Jerusalem, Yad Vashem was built by the Israeli government to commemorate the Holocaust victims, where there is also a memorial plaque to the victims of Kladovo.

In 1964, on the Jewish cemetery in Belgrade, the Jewish community of Vienna built a monument to the 800 Austrian Jews transported.

On 22 April 1995, the "day of remembrance of the victims of the genocide", a monument by sculptor  was unveiled for the victims of the Sajmište concentration camp, on the banks of the Sava in Belgrade. The ten meter high, abstract composition of bronze is outside the boundary of the camp, so that they can be seen from the bridge and the fortress.

On 8 July to 4 November 2001, the Jewish Museum, Vienna was held an exhibition, " Kladovo – An Escape to Palestine". The basis of the exhibition were photographs that were taken by participants of transport during the flight and were by survivors Ehud Nahir from Palestine. The album compiled by Nahir was reproduced from Douer. In addition, a documentary film by Alisa Douer, was produced with the support of the National Fund of the Republic of Austria for Victims of National Socialism. The exhibition was complemented by a bilingual companion book. Alisa Douer and Reinhard Geir were the exhibition curators.

Legal prosecution
In 1966, Herbert Andorfer was investigated, and in 1967 could have been arrested in Munich. He was handed over to Austrian authorities and a short time later extradited to the Federal Republic of Germany, where he was sentenced for murder in 1968 to two and a half years in prison.

In 1947, Franz Böhme committed suicide before his trial.

In 1968, Edgar Enge was also prosecuted in Germany. However, he was indeed guilty to murder for aiding and abetting, was put on probation.

References

Sources
Gabriele Anderl, Walter Manoschek: Gescheiterte Flucht. Der jüdische "Kladovo-Transport" auf dem Weg nach Palästina 1939–42. Verlag für Gesellschaftskritik, Wien 1993, .
Željko Dragić: Die Reise in die Ewigkeit. 70 Jahre Kladovo Transport. Putovanje u večnost. 70 godina Kladovo transporta. Twist Zeitschriften Verlag GmbH, Wien 2013,  .
Alisa Douer im Auftrag des Jüdischen Museums Wien (Hrsg.): Kladovo – Eine Flucht nach Palästina/Escape to Palestine. Mandelbaum Verlag, Wien 2001,  (Begleitpublikation in deutsch und englisch zur Ausstellung Kladovo – Eine Flucht nach Palästina, Jüdisches Museum Wien, 8 July to 4 November 2001).
Erika Weinzierl, Otto D. Kulka (Hrsg.): Vertreibung und Neubeginn. Israelische Bürger österreichischer Herkunft. Böhlau-Verlag, Wien/Köln/Weimar 1992, .
Walter Manoschek: "Serbien ist judenfrei". Militärische Besatzungspolitik und Judenvernichtung in Serbien 1941/42. 2. Auflage. Oldenbourg Verlag, München 1993, 

The Holocaust in Austria
The Holocaust in Yugoslavia
Zionism in Austria